Castelnau-de-Guers (Languedocien: Castèlnòu de Guèrs) is a commune in the Hérault department in southern France. It is the birthplace of historian Michel Christol.

Population

See also
Communes of the Hérault department

References

Communes of Hérault